Schilly is a surname. Notable people with the surname include:

Dale Schilly, American soccer coach
Katy Schilly (born 1956), American long-distance runner
Mary Knisely, born Schilly in 1959, American middle-distance runner

See also
Schill